Robyn Stevan is a Canadian actress. She is best known for her role in the film Bye Bye Blues, for which she won the Genie Award for Best Supporting Actress at the 11th Genie Awards in 1990.

Stevan developed an interest in acting in her last two years at Seaquam Secondary School in Delta, British Columbia. After that, she shifted her attention from her previous interests of rhythmic gymnastics and a possible career in medicine. She began studying a general arts curriculum at the University of British Columbia but left school to go to Japan to work on Rice Curry, a production of Fuji TV. She has appeared in the films The Stepfather (1987), Captive Hearts (1987) and Paint Cans (1994).

Stevan's performance in The Squamish Five brought her the Best Actor Award from the Atlantic Film Festival.

Filmography

Film

Television

References

External links 
 

Canadian film actresses
Canadian television actresses
Best Supporting Actress Genie and Canadian Screen Award winners
Year of birth missing (living people)
Living people